Morningside Hospital may refer to:

Morningside Hospital (California), a former hospital in Los Angeles, California, United States
Morningside Hospital (Oregon), a former psychiatric facility in Portland, Oregon, United States